Joseph Walter Clark (15 February 1890 – 1960) was an English professional footballer who played as an outside forward for Cardiff City, Southampton and Rochdale in the 1920s.

Football career

Clark was born in Willington Quay on Tyneside and played his early football with Wallsend Park Villa and Hebburn Argyle.

In May 1913 he joined Welsh club, Cardiff City, remaining on their books until after the First World War. In 1921 he was part of the Cardiff City side which reached the semi-finals of the FA Cup, going out to Wolverhampton Wanderers in a replay. During the cup run, Cardiff (then in the Second Division) defeated First Division sides Sunderland and Chelsea.

Clark then spent a season in the Welsh section of the Southern League with Aberaman Athletic. In May 1922, Southampton were looking for an outside left to replace Fred Foxall, who had left the previous March. Clark had impressed the Saints' directors in the FA Cup match between the two sides in February 1921 and moved to the south coast. He made his debut in a 0–0 draw at South Shields on 26 August 1922 and retained his place until late December, when he was replaced by Len Andrews.

Clark was placed on the transfer list in the summer of 1923 at a fee of £100, but was eventually given a free transfer to  Rochdale before moving on to Norwich City, Exeter City and Aldershot.

References

External links
Career details on www.11v11.com

1890 births
1960 deaths
People from Willington Quay
Footballers from Tyne and Wear
English footballers
Hebburn Argyle F.C. players
Cardiff City F.C. players
Aberdare Town F.C. players
Southampton F.C. players
Rochdale A.F.C. players
Norwich City F.C. players
Exeter City F.C. players
Aldershot F.C. players
English Football League players
Association football wingers
Southern Football League players